There are several forms for date and time notation in Colombia.

Date
In Colombia, the standard dd/mm/yyyy is widely used:

31/12/2008

Also long date format is used, example:

 (31 December 2008)

Time
Colombia uses the 12-hour format for clocks, but a format specifying the place of the sun is more commonly used for informal communication. This is because there are no time seasons, so that sunset and dawn are at approximately the same time every day. For example:

Time in Colombia
Colombia